These are the rosters of all participating teams at the women's water polo tournament at the 2007 World Aquatics Championships held between 18 March to 1 April in Melbourne, Australia.

































See also
Water polo at the 2007 World Aquatics Championships – Men's team rosters

References

World Aquatics Championships water polo squads
Women's team rosters
2007 in women's water polo